Lake El Golfete is a long narrow lake in Guatemala. It lies at sea level and is connected by the Dulce River from Lake Izabal draining to the Amatique Bay in the Caribbean Sea.

References

El Golfete
Geography of the Izabal Department